John William "Jack" Nicholson Sr. (born February 22, 1934) is an American retired Brigadier General of the United States Army who was appointed secretary of the American Battle Monuments Commission (ABMC) by President George W. Bush in January 2005. He is the father of John W. "Mick" Nicholson Jr., also a retired general of the United States Army.

Biography
Prior to this appointment, he served as Under Secretary for Memorial Affairs in the Department of Veterans Affairs, where he directed the National Cemetery Administration.

Born and raised in Iowa, he is a 1956 graduate of the United States Military Academy at West Point, New York, where he received the General MacArthur Leadership Award for his class, and holds a master's degree in public administration from the University of Pennsylvania. He is an airborne ranger combat infantryman and served two and one-half years with infantry units in Vietnam. Other overseas assignments during his 30-year Army career included duty in Germany, Korea, Lebanon and Switzerland. Recommended for a Silver Star for action in Vietnam, the award was approved in 2009.

He currently serves on the board of advisors of the Code of Support Foundation, a nonprofit military service organization.

He is the brother of Jim Nicholson, a former Secretary of Veterans Affairs and Chair of the Republican National Committee. His son John W. Nicholson Jr. is a 1982 graduate of West Point and was the U.S. Army general in charge of the Resolute Support Mission in Afghanistan for more than 2 years. Nicholson Sr. and his wife Sophie have five children and thirteen grandchildren.

Awards and decorations

References

1934 births
Living people
Place of birth missing (living people)
United States Military Academy alumni
Military personnel from Iowa
United States Army Rangers
United States Army personnel of the Vietnam War
Recipients of the Silver Star
University of Pennsylvania alumni
Recipients of the Meritorious Service Medal (United States)
Recipients of the Legion of Merit
United States Army generals
Recipients of the Distinguished Service Medal (US Army)